Balázs Tölgyesi (born 10 January 1973) is a Hungarian middle-distance runner. He competed in the men's 1500 metres at the 1996 Summer Olympics.

Personal bests
Outdoor
800 metres – 1:46.05 (Rio de Janeiro 1998)
1500 metres – 3:35.57 (Atlanta 1996) NR
Mile – 3:55.34 (Sheffield 1996)
2000 metres – 5:05.12 (London 1996)
3000 metres – 8:28.01 (St-Maur 2001)
5000 metres – 13:19.12 (San Juan Capistrano 2021)
10,000 metres – 27:45.78 (Palo Alto 2021)
Outdoor
800 metres – 1:47.73 (Lincoln 1997)
1500 metres – 3:39.42 (Boston 1997)
Mile – 4:00.91 (Fairfax 1997)
3000 metres – 8:08.54 (Sindelfingen 1998)

References

1973 births
Living people
Athletes (track and field) at the 1996 Summer Olympics
Hungarian male middle-distance runners
Olympic athletes of Hungary
Place of birth missing (living people)
20th-century Hungarian people